Anthony Brandon Wong (born 12 May 1965), often credited simply as Anthony Wong, is an Australian actor.  His roles include Ghost in The Matrix Reloaded and The Matrix Revolutions.

Career
His role of Ghost from The Matrix Reloaded and The Matrix Revolutions was greatly expanded in the video game Enter the Matrix, in which he starred alongside Jada Pinkett Smith as the lead. Prior to landing his role as Ghost, he originally auditioned for Tank in the first film, but lost out to Marcus Chong.

Wong's other roles include Jumping Ship as the leader of modern-day pirates, Little Fish, two stints on Home and Away, Mek – a scientist in Spellbinder: Land of the Dragon Lord, the 2004 film Flight of the Phoenix and as Tasuke Kogo in the 2008 six-part miniseries, Samurai Girl. He played the role of Danny Law in the 2016 comedy TV series The Family Law.

Personal life
Wong is openly gay.

Filmography

Film

Television

Web

Video games

Awards and nominations

References

External links
 
 

1965 births
Australian male film actors
Australian people of Chinese descent
Australian gay actors
Living people
Male actors from Sydney
21st-century Australian LGBT people